Canoeing and Kayaking were held at the 1994 Asian Games in Yachiyo Lake, Hiroshima, Japan from October 5 to October 10. Men's and women's competition were held in Kayak and men's competition in Canoe. The competition included only sprint events.

Medalists

Men

Women

Medal table

References 

 New Straits Times, October 5–11, 1994
 Results

External links 
 Olympic Council of Asia

 
1994 Asian Games events
1994
Asian Games
1994 Asian Games